Chromaticity is the ninth studio album by guitarist Tony MacAlpine, released on August 7, 2001 through Shrapnel Records.

Critical reception

Glenn Astarita at AllMusic gave Chromaticity three stars out of five, saying that "Simply put, MacAlpine possesses enormous chops!" He also praised the contributions of drummer Steve Smith and bassist Barry Sparks.

Track listing

Personnel
Tony MacAlpine – guitar, keyboard, piano, production
Steve Smith – drums, production
Barry Sparks – bass
Robert M. Biles – engineering
Bernie Torelli – mixing, mastering

References

External links
In Review: Tony MacAlpine "Chromaticity" at Guitar Nine Records

Tony MacAlpine albums
2001 albums
Shrapnel Records albums
Albums recorded in a home studio